Emma Bristow  (born 29 October 1990 in Boston, Lincolnshire, United Kingdom), is an Professional motorcycle trials rider and 8 times Women's World Trials Champion. In 2014 Emma became the first British rider to win the Women's FIM Trial World Championship. She also won the Women's FIM Trial European Championship in 2013 and the British Women's title in 2014.

Biography
Emma began riding at the age of 4 and became a four time British Youth Champion. 

She started her international career at the 2006 World Championships, riding to 9th place in the Andorra round at the age of 16. Competing on a Gas Gas Emma contested the European and World rounds over the next few seasons.

Emma signed for the Ossa factory in 2011 and rode to runner up position in the World Championships, a result she repeated in 2012. At the end of the season Emma left her factory ride at Ossa to join Sherco. 

2013 proved to be a successful year with Emma winning her first Women's FIM Trial European Championship title.

Emma went from strength to strength in 2014 when she clinched both the British Women's Title and the Women's FIM Trial World Championship title that had eluded her the previous two years.

Bristow married fellow rider James Fry on 10 November 2018.

National Trials Championship Career

International Trials Championship Career

Honors
 British Women's Trials Champion 2014, 2015, 2016, 2017, 2018
 British Women's Indoor Trials Champion 2014, 2015, 2016, 2017, 2018.
 European Women's Trials Champion 2013, 2017
 FIM World Women's Trials Champion 2014, 2015, 2016, 2017, 2018, 2019, 2020.
 Trial des Nations (2009, 2013, 2014, 2015, 2016, 2018)

Related Reading
FIM Trial European Championship
FIM Trial World Championship

References

External links
 http://www.emmabristowmoto.com/Emma Bristow Official Website

1990 births
Living people
People from Boston, Lincolnshire
Sportspeople from Lincolnshire
English sportswomen
English motorcycle racers
Motorcycle trials riders
Female motorcycle racers